Eleoscytalopus is a genus of tapaculos found in lowland Atlantic forest of eastern Brazil. Until recently, they were included in the genus Scytalopus, but the two species are actually closer to the bristlefronts (genus Merulaxis). Unlike the members of the genus Scytalopus, the members of Eleoscytalopus have largely white underparts and bluish-grey upperparts. The voices of the members of the two genera also differ.

Species

References
 Maurício, N. M, Mata, H., Bornschein, M. R., Cadena, C. D., Alvarenga, H., &  Bonatto, S. L. (2008). Hidden generic diversity in Neotropical birds: Molecular and anatomical data support a new genus for the “Scytalopus” indigoticus species-group (Aves: Rhinocryptidae). Molecular Phylogenetics and Evolution. 49(1): 125–135.

 
Bird genera
Rhinocryptidae